The ''Cape May Times''' was created in 2001 by Jane Kashlak, a former WNBC investigative producer and five-time New York Emmy Award winner.1991-1992 New York Emmy Awards  Retrieved 2011-10-07.42nd annual New York Emmy Awards  Retrieved 2011-10-07.
The online publication originated as a guide to local events and movie times. Since then it has grown to include information about many aspects of life in Cape May, New Jersey. The Cape May Times features stories about nature, as The Washington Post mentioned in an article on winter breaks. While the site has much information for tourists, it also provides a local person's view of life in Cape May. Kashlak, the Times editor, was named one of South Jersey’s People To Watch in 2009.

References

External links 
 

Cape May, New Jersey
Cape May County, New Jersey
2001 establishments in New Jersey